Fort McIntosh was an early American log frontier fort situated near the confluence of the Ohio River and the Beaver River in what is now Beaver, Pennsylvania.

The fortress was constructed in 1778 under the direction of Lt. Col. Cambray-Digny, a French engineer, and named in honor of General Lachlan McIntosh. The fortress was the site of the signing of the Treaty of Fort McIntosh on January 21, 1785. It was occupied until it was abandoned in 1791.  After the Revolution, the fort was the home of the First American Regiment, the oldest active unit in the United States Army.

The fort was in the form of a trapezoid, about 150 feet on each side, with raised earthen bastions on each corner.  Log palisades connected the bastions, and a 15 foot wide ditch protected three sides of the fort, with the 130 foot slope to the Ohio River protecting the other side. Inside were three barracks, warehouses, officer's quarters, a forge, kitchen, and powder magazines. The fort may have had either two or four iron cannon.

Around the year 1976, citizens of the nearby community of Beaver decided, with great fanfare, to excavate the pilings and remaining stone foundations of the original Ft. McIntosh.  They were successful in locating the outlines of the revolutionary era fort.  Their efforts culminated in a dedication, presided over by retired Gen. William Westmoreland, in the summer of 1977.  In late 2010, a local business owner donated money for a granite and sandstone memorial on the fort site.

The fort site was listed on the National Register of Historic Places in 1975.  In 1996, most of Beaver was listed on the National Register of Historic Places as the "Beaver Historic District.  At that time, the fort site was singled out as one of the most significant of the district's 1,250 contributing properties.

The Beaver Area Heritage Foundation protects the restored site, which features granite monuments and bronze plaques, as well as the original stone footers of the walls and fireplaces.

Further reading

Neville, Gabriel (2020). "A Portrait of John Cuppy." Emerging Revolutionary War Era. Includes a detailed contemporary description of the fort.

See also
List of European archaeological sites on the National Register of Historic Places in Pennsylvania

References

External links
 Fort McIntosh - Beaver Area Heritage Foundation

McIntosh
Archaeological sites on the National Register of Historic Places in Pennsylvania
Protected areas of Beaver County, Pennsylvania
McIntosh
Northwest Indian War
Individually listed contributing properties to historic districts on the National Register in Pennsylvania
McIntosh
National Register of Historic Places in Beaver County, Pennsylvania